Ivankivtsi is a village in Ternopil Raion, Ternopil Oblast (province) of western Ukraine. It belongs to Ternopil urban hromada, one of the hromadas of Ukraine.

Until 18 July 2020, Ivankivtsi belonged to Zboriv Raion. The raion was abolished in July 2020 as part of the administrative reform of Ukraine, which reduced the number of raions of Ternopil Oblast to three. The area of Zboriv Raion was merged into Ternopil Raion.

Population
Population in 1880: 641 inhabitants.
Population in 1921: 1119 inhabitants with over 165 houses.
Population in 2001: 410 inhabitants.
Population in 2014: 321 inhabitants with over 161 houses.

They were born in Ivankivtsi:
 geologist Butsura (1900–1937),
 military colonels Yevhen Dziubanovskyi and Petro Karpyk,
 Candidate of Technical Sciences, teacher Petro Kryvyi (born in 1943),
 Candidate of Historical Sciences, Professor Bohdan Lanovyk (b. 1936), and his father, public and cooperative figure Dmytro Lanovyk (1900–1983).

References

Notes

Sources

External links
Official data about the village  

Ternopil urban hromada
Villages in Ternopil Raion